The Ministry of Environment is the cabinet ministry of the Government of Sri Lanka with oversight of the environment and the Mahaweli Development programme, as well as the general development of the Mahaweli River, its environs and communities living within defined 'Mahaweli development zones'.

Effective 1 September 2017, the ministry banned the use of polythene with a thickness of under 20 microns for use, sale or distribution, as well as the use, sale or distribution of polystyrene food containers and utensils. The current minister is Naseer Ahamed, who took office on 23 May 2022.

List of ministers

Parties

References

External links
 Ministry of Environment
 Government of Sri Lanka

Environment ministers of Sri Lanka
Environment
Environmental organisations based in Sri Lanka
Sri Lanka
Environment